A corpus cavernosum penis (singular) (literally "cave-like body" of the penis, plural corpora cavernosa) is one of a pair of sponge-like regions of erectile tissue, which contain most of the blood in the penis during an erection. 

Such a corpus is homologous to the corpus cavernosum clitoridis in the female; the body of the clitoris that contains erectile tissue in a pair of corpora cavernosa with a recognisably similar structure.

Anatomy
The two corpora cavernosa and corpus spongiosum (also known as the corpus cavernosum urethrae in older texts and in the adjacent diagram) are three expandable erectile tissues along the length of the penis, which fill with blood during penile erection. The two corpora cavernosa lie along the penis shaft, from the pubic bones to the head of the penis, where they join. These formations are made of a sponge-like tissue containing trabeculae, irregular blood-filled spaces lined by endothelium and separated by septum of the penis.

The male anatomy has no vestibular bulbs, but instead a corpus spongiosum, a smaller region along the bottom of the penis, which contains the urethra and forms the glans penis.

Physiology
In some circumstances, release of nitric oxide precedes relaxation of muscles in the corpora cavernosa and corpus spongiosum, in a process similar to female arousal. The spongy tissue fills with blood, from arteries down the length of the penis. A little blood enters the corpus spongiosum; the remainder engorges the corpora cavernosa, which expand to hold 90% of the blood involved in an erection, increasing both in length and in diameter. The function of the corpus spongiosum is to prevent compression of the urethra during erection.

Blood can leave the erectile tissue only through a drainage system of veins around the outside wall of the corpus cavernosum. The expanding spongy tissue presses against a surrounding dense tissue (tunica albuginea) constricting these veins, preventing blood from leaving. The penis becomes rigid as a result. The glans penis, the expanded cap of the corpus spongiosum, remains more malleable during erection because its tunica albuginea is much thinner than elsewhere in the penis.

Additional images

See also
 Peyronie's disease

References

External links
  - "The Male Perineum and the Penis: Penis"

Mammal male reproductive system
Human penis anatomy